The 1996 Daytona 500, the 38th running of the event, was run on February 18, 1996, at Daytona International Speedway in Daytona Beach, Florida, as the first race of the 1996 NASCAR Winston Cup season. Dale Jarrett won this race for the second time after winning it in 1993 and for the first (and only) time in all of Daytona 500 history, Dale Earnhardt won the pole position, allowing many to believe that he would finally win the race. Ernie Irvan returned to race full-time alongside Earnhardt (both drivers won their respective Gatorade Twin 125-mile qualifying races).

Background

Daytona International Speedway is a race track in Daytona Beach, Florida, that is one of six superspeedways to hold NASCAR races, the others being Michigan International Speedway, Auto Club Speedway, Indianapolis Motor Speedway, Pocono Raceway, and Talladega Superspeedway. The track also features two other layouts that utilize portions of the primary high speed tri-oval, such as a  sports car course and a  motorcycle course. The track's  infield includes the  Lake Lloyd, which has hosted powerboat racing. The speedway is owned and operated by International Speedway Corporation.

The track was built by NASCAR founder Bill France, Sr. to host racing that was being held at the former Daytona Beach Road Course and opened with the first Daytona 500 in 1959. The Daytona 500 is regarded as the most important and prestigious race on the NASCAR calendar. It is also the series' first race of the year; this phenomenon is virtually unique in sports, which tend to have championships or other major events at the end of the season rather than the start.

Race summary

Opening laps
The lead changed four times between Ernie Irvan, Ken Schrader, Sterling Marlin, and Dale Earnhardt in the first five laps. 
Reigning Winston Cup champion Jeff Gordon was eliminated on lap 8 after getting a light tap from Jeremy Mayfield. Busch Series Goody's 300 winner Steve Grissom, along with Joe Nemechek (both Busch Series champions), Rick Mast, and Rusty Wallace, were involved in a chain reaction incident after Gordon hit the wall. Mast's and Wallace's cars both were relatively undamaged, but Grissom and Nemechek lost several laps after repairs. On lap 29, Earnhardt's ignition failed, triggering a wreck for Ernie Irvan. Wally Dallenbach Jr., who could not see Earnhardt, tagged Irvan and sent him into the wall.

Due to a new rules package, the lead changed hands early and often. On lap 50, no one but Dale Earnhardt or Terry Labonte (the new leader) had spent more than 4 consecutive laps in the lead. Lap 54 saw 1990 race winner Derrike Cope hit the turn 4 wall, which ended his day.

Mid-race developments
On lap 77, 1994 and 1995 winner Sterling Marlin took the lead away from Terry Labonte and led three laps before having engine problems. Not much later, Labonte began to drop back with overheating issues after leading the most laps at 44. He managed a decent finish, but Marlin almost instantly retired from the lead. IndyCar veteran John Andretti, whose uncle Mario won the 1967 race, became the new leader. He and Earnhardt, along with Bill Elliott, Dale Jarrett, Ken Schrader and Michael Waltrip, were all prime contenders at halfway. The field made green flag pit stops over the next 10 laps. Andretti came in for another pit stop immediately after his scheduled stop because not all of the right rear lugnuts had been tightened. On lap 131, while trying to get his lap back, he had a hard crash in turn 2. Waltrip clipped him as he tried to go past his spinning car, only to damage the right-front fender. The damage seemed to improve the car's aerodynamic qualities. Shortly after the restart, Mike Wallace suddenly snapped loose and collected Loy Allen Jr., Brett Bodine and Bobby Labonte, whose car was relatively undamaged. Only Wallace; Allen Jr.; and Bodine were all done for the day.

Run to the finish
Geoff Bodine and Lake Speed crashed at lap 159, collecting Bobby Hamilton, Chad Little, Robert Pressley, Jeff Purvis and Morgan Shepherd. This prompted the final pit stops. Dale Jarrett and his crew chief Todd Parrott decided on a four-tire change, while the RCR duo Earnhardt and Petree opted for two. Bud Moore, whose car and driver Wally Dallenbach Jr. were not yet sponsored for the season, were going to gamble that their full tank of fuel from the previous caution would be enough to finish. Even so, Dallenbach kept the #15 in the lead pack in the waning laps. Earnhardt quickly dispatched new leader and last year's Rookie of the Year Ricky Craven. He lost the lead briefly to Schrader but at lap 177, Jarrett passed him with four fresh tires. Earnhardt could keep up with Jarrett, but he could not repass him. This would allow Jarrett to win his second Daytona 500 win, followed by Earnhardt, Schrader, Mark Martin and Jeff Burton.

Results

References

Daytona 500
Daytona 500
NASCAR races at Daytona International Speedway